Evansville Municipal Market, also known as Old City Market, is a historic public market located in downtown Evansville, Indiana. It was designed by Edward J. Thole of the architecture firm Clifford Shopbell & Co. and built between 1916 and 1918 for the city of Evansville. It is a two-story, Prairie School style brick building.  It has a low red pantile roof with deep overhanging eaves.  It was converted for use as a fire station in 1954. 

It was listed on the National Register of Historic Places in 1983.

References

Government buildings on the National Register of Historic Places in Indiana
Prairie School architecture in Indiana
Government buildings completed in 1918
Buildings and structures in Evansville, Indiana
National Register of Historic Places in Evansville, Indiana